Valbuena is a Spanish surname. Notable people with the surname include:

Acacio Valbuena Rodríguez (1922–2011), Spanish Roman Catholic priest
Ángel Valbuena Prat (1900–1977), Spanish philologist and historian
Álvaro Valbuena (born 1941), Colombian artist
José Luis Valbuena (born 1971), Venezuelan boxer
Luis Valbuena (1985–2018), Venezuelan baseball player
Mathieu Valbuena (born 1984), French footballer

See also
Valbuena Abbey, Cistercian monastery in Spain
Valbuena de Duero, municipality in Castile and León, Spain
Valbuena de Pisuerga, municipality in Castile and León, Spain

Spanish-language surnames